Desulfobacula toluolica is a Gram-negative and sulfate-reducing bacterium from the genus of Desulfobacula which has been isolated from marine mud in the United States.

References

Further reading

External links 
Type strain of Desulfobacula toluolica at BacDive -  the Bacterial Diversity Metadatabase

Desulfobacterales
Bacteria described in 2000